Firozepur Cantonment railway station (station code: FZR) is located in Firozepur district in the Indian state of Punjab and serves  Firozepur, on the banks of the Sutlej River .

The railway station

History
The Southern Punjab Railway Co. opened the Delhi–Bhatinda–Samasatta line in 1897. The line passed through Muktasar and Fazilka tehsils and provided direct connection through Samma Satta (now in Pakistan) to Karachi. The extension from the Macleodganj (later renamed Mandi Sadiqganj and now in Pakistan) railway line to Ludhiana was opened by the same company in 1905.

The Firozpur Cantonment-Jalandhar City branch line was opened in 1912.

Railway division
Firozpur railway division covers a large area with railway lines under its jurisdiction – covering parts of Punjab, Jammu & Kashmir and Himachal Pradesh.

Trains
Following express trains originate/terminate at Firozpur Cantt.

Fzr-Ndls shatabdi express
Fzr-Durg antyodya express

References

External links
 Trains at Firozpur Cantonment

Railway stations in Firozpur district
Firozpur railway division
Transport in Firozpur
Railway stations opened in 1905